In mathematics, given an additive subgroup , the Novikov ring  of  is the subring of  consisting of formal sums  such that  and . The notion was introduced by  Sergei Novikov in the papers that initiated the generalization of Morse theory using a closed one-form instead of a function. The notion is used in quantum cohomology, among the others.

The Novikov ring  is a principal ideal domain. Let S be the subset of  consisting of those with leading term 1.

Novikov numbers 
Morse homology): 
 

In an analogy with this, one can define "Novikov numbers". Let X be a connected polyhedron with a base point. Each cohomology class  may be viewed as a linear functional on the first homology group ; when composed with the Hurewicz homomorphism, it can be viewed as a group homomorphism . By the universal property, this map in turns gives a ring homomorphism, 
, 
Since X is a connected polyhedron, a local coefficient system over it corresponds one-to-one to a -module.

The analog of Morse inequalities holds for Novikov numbers as well (cf. the reference for now.)

Notes

References 
 
 S. P. Novikov, Multi-valued functions and functionals: An analogue of Morse theory. Soviet Mathematics - Doklady 24 (1981), 222–226.
 S. P. Novikov: The Hamiltonian formalism and a multi-valued analogue of Morse theory. Russian Mathematical Surveys 35:5 (1982), 1–56.

External links 
Different definitions of Novikov ring?

Commutative algebra
Ring theory
Morse theory